Viki Indra Okvana (born 21 October 1988) is an Indonesian badminton player from Suryanaga Mutiara Timur club. He also played for the Deltacar Benátky nad Jizerou club in Czech Republic. He was the bronze medallists at the 2005 Asian Junior Championships in the boys' doubles and team event. Okvana was selected to join the Indonesia national team in 2006. He won the mixed doubles title at the 2007 Dutch Junior International tournament partnered with Richi Puspita Dili. Okvana who educated at the STIE Perbanas Jakarta competed at the 2007 Summer Universiade in Bangkok, winning a bronze medal in the mixed team event. Partnered with Gustiani Megawati, they won the mixed doubles title at the Czech, Turkey, Bahrain and Hungarian International tournaments. He also won the men's doubles title at the Austrian International with Ardiansyah Putra, and Hungarian International with Albert Saputra.

Achievements

Asian Junior Championships 
Boys' doubles

BWF International Challenge/Series
Men's doubles

Mixed doubles

 BWF International Challenge tournament
 BWF International Series tournament

References

External links
 

1988 births
Living people
Sportspeople from East Java
Indonesian male badminton players
Universiade medalists in badminton
Universiade bronze medalists for Indonesia
21st-century Indonesian people